David Leslie Moir (2 May 1897 – q4 1969) was an English footballer who played as a centre half in the Football League for Darlington. He was on the books of Tottenham Hotspur without playing League football for them, and also played for London University.

Life and career
Moir was born in Heaton, Newcastle, the second child of David Moir, a police constable, and his wife Elizabeth. He began his senior football career with Tottenham Hotspur, but never played for the first team. He played for London University's football team, and had a month's trial in early 1923 with Northampton Town, who were looking for a stand-in to allow player-manager Bob Hewison to concentrate on his managerial duties. His only appearance in the Football League was for Darlington on 1 September 1923, deputising for Billy Robinson in the Third Division North match against Accrington Stanley; Darlington lost 2–0.

The 1939 Register finds Moir living with his wife, Margaret, and two children in Bodenham Road, Birmingham, working as a commercial traveller (branch manager), and serving as a special constable. He died in 1969 in the North Walsham area of Norfolk.

References

1897 births
1969 deaths
Footballers from Newcastle upon Tyne
English footballers
Association football defenders
Tottenham Hotspur F.C. players
Northampton Town F.C. players
Darlington F.C. players
English Football League players
People associated with the University of London
Date of death missing